Köndük is a village in southern Kyrgyzstan. It is located in Osh Region towards the west of the Tian Shan mountain range. Its population was 1,177 in 2021.

References

Populated places in Osh Region